The 1932–33 Swiss International Ice Hockey Championship was the 18th and final edition of the international ice hockey championship in Switzerland. Grasshopper Club Zürich won the championship by finishing first in the final round.

First round

Eastern Series

Final 
 EHC St. Moritz - HC Davos 1:3

Central Series

Western Series

Semifinals 
 Lycée Jaccard - Star Lausanne 2:0
 HC Château-d'Oex - HC Rosey Gstaad 0:3

Final 
 HC Rosey Gstaad - HC Château-d'Oex 7:3

Final round

External links 
Swiss Ice Hockey Federation – All-time results

Inter
Swiss International Ice Hockey Championship seasons